Rathindranath Roy is a Bangladeshi musician. He was a performer in Swadhin Bangla Betar Kendra. Roy sang Bhawaiya songs from the Rangpur area. He is also a playback singer. He has won awards like BACHSHASH (Bangladesh Cine Journalists Society) Award in 1979 and 1981, and Ekushey Padak in 1994.

Early life and education
Roy passed SSC examination in 1960 and passed HSC from Dhaka College. He then enrolled into department of Bengali Literature in the University of Dhaka in 1968.

Career
Roy began his career as an artist in 1960. He became a regular singer on radio and television. He learnt music from his father Harolal Roy and PC Gomez. He performed in programs when he was a student of Dhaka University.

In 2002 he founded the Bhawaiya Academy in Rangpur. Now the institution has branches in Gaibandha, Kurigram and Lalmonirhat.

Awards
 BACHSHASH  (1979, 1981)
 Ekushey Padak (1994)
 Popular Folk Song Award in the World Youth Festival (East Germany, 1973)

Personal life
Roy has been married to Sondhya Roy, a singer. They have two sons and a daughter, Chandra Roy, who is a singer as well. As of 2011 Roy has been living with his family in New York.

References

Recipients of the Ekushey Padak
Living people
Dhaka College alumni
University of Dhaka alumni
Bangladeshi male musicians
Bengali Hindus
Bangladeshi Hindus
Year of birth missing (living people)
Place of birth missing (living people)
Honorary Fellows of Bangla Academy